But Not in Vain (Dutch name Niet Tevergeefs) is a 1948 Anglo-Dutch World War II drama, directed by Edmond T. Gréville and starring Raymond Lovell.  The film is set in 1944 in the occupied Netherlands, and was shot at the Cinetone Studios in Amsterdam, with exterior filming taking place at locations in and around the city.  The film also incorporates authentic wartime footage filmed by members of the Dutch Resistance. The Dutch version of the film was the first Dutch production of a feature film after World War II.

Plot
In late 1944, the Hongerwinter famine is starting to bite in the occupied northern and western Netherlands and Nazi persecution is rife.  The farm of Jan Alting (Lovell), a Dutch patriot who has disowned his son for his collaboration with the occupying German forces, is known by the Dutch Resistance as a place of refuge for those who are in danger from the Germans.  With the help of his daughter Elly (Carol van Derman), Alting is currently providing shelter for Jewish couple Mark and Mary Meyer (Martin Benson and Agnes Bernelle); van Nespen (Bruce Lester), an aristocrat with active links to the underground movement, and Bakker (Julian Dallas), a Communist wanted by the Germans for sabotage.  All are aware of the constant risk of betrayal and exposure.

Jan's son Anton (Jordan Lawrence) returns unexpectedly to his former home, and discovers that his father and sister are harbouring subversives.  He orders his father to turn them out immediately, threatening to shoot them all if this is not done.  Jan is faced with the seemingly irreconcilable demands of patriotism and responsibility for the safety of his shelterers, set against the feelings he still has for Anton, despite the latter's betrayal of all Jan stands for.  He faces the stark moral choice of failing those to whom he has given refuge, or conspiring with them to kill his own son.

Origin of the name
The film's name is derived from a wartime radio speech by the exiled Queen Wilhelmina of the Netherlands, exhorting her people to resist the Nazi occupation and promising that their struggle and sacrifice would not be in vain.

Cast
 Raymond Lovell as Jan Alting
 Carol van Derman as Elly Alting
 Bruce Lester as Fred van Nespen
 Martin Benson as Mark Meyer
 Agnes Bernelle as Mary Meyer
 Julian Dallas as Willem Bakker
 Jordan Lawrence as Anton
 Ben van Esselstyn as Sgt. Eeslyn
 Harry Croizet as Skipper

Later history
But Not in Vain was first screened in December 1948; however surviving contemporary reviews all date from early 1950, leading to the assumption that a general release was delayed until then for unknown reasons.  The film received some generally favourable reviews, with Today's Cinema describing it as "intelligently directed, always with artistry and sometimes with real dramatic power", and the Daily Film Renter praising "well-drawn characters, gripping story and happy climax".  The Monthly Film Bulletin in contrast dismissed it as "uniquely incompetent".

The British Film Institute has been unable to locate a print of the film for inclusion in the BFI National Archive, and classes it as "missing, believed lost".  There is increasing interest by film historians in Gréville's directorial career, with the same year's Noose being particularly highly regarded.  The current absence of But Not in Vain represents a crucial gap in Gréville's filmography, and the BFI lists the film as one of its "75 Most Wanted" missing British feature films.

References

External links 
 
 

1948 films
1948 drama films
1940s multilingual films
1940s lost films
Films set in 1944
Western Front of World War II films
Lost British films
Lost drama films
1940s English-language films
British black-and-white films
Dutch black-and-white films
Films set in the Netherlands
British drama films
British multilingual films
Films directed by Edmond T. Gréville
1940s British films